Jenne is a comune (municipality) in the Metropolitan City of Rome in the Italian region Lazio, located about  east of Rome.

Jenne borders the following municipalities: Arcinazzo Romano, Subiaco, Trevi nel Lazio, Vallepietra.

In the late 12th century, it was the birthplace of Pope Alexander IV.

References

Cities and towns in Lazio